Noakhali-5 is a constituency represented in the Jatiya Sangsad (National Parliament) of Bangladesh since 2008 by Obaidul Quader of the Awami League.

Boundaries 
The constituency encompasses Companiganj and Kabirhat upazilas.

History 
The constituency was created for the first general elections in newly independent Bangladesh, held in 1973.

Ahead of the 2018 general election, the Election Commission reduced the boundaries of the constituency by removing two union parishads of Noakhali Sadar Upazila: Ashwadia and Niazpur.

Members of Parliament

Elections

Elections in the 2010s 
Obaidul Quader was re-elected unopposed in the 2014 general election after opposition parties withdrew their candidacies in a boycott of the election.

Elections in the 2000s

Elections in the 1990s

References

External links
 

Parliamentary constituencies in Bangladesh
Noakhali District